Leda Had a Little Swan is a 1968 play written by Bamber Gascoigne. It never officially opened. The work, which included references to sexual relations between parents and their children, had not received a licence to perform in London but had been taken up by Broadway producer Claire Nichtern for staging at the Cort Theatre, New York, under the direction of André Gregory. The play was cancelled on the day before opening, after fourteen previews.

The play was pilloried in the William Goldman book The Season: A Candid Look at Broadway, which described "spluttering outrage ... and scuffles in the lobby" during its short run of public previews.

References

1968 plays